National Enquirer TV was a 30-minute newsmagazine show starring National Enquirer magazine columnist Mike Walker. The show debuted on August 30, 1999 in many markets.

In season 1, Mike's co host in the first half was former KABC-TV morning anchor Susan Campos. In the 2nd half of the 1st season, Campos was joined by current WOLO-TV anchor James Hill.

In season 2, National Enquirer TV changed its name to National Enquirer's Uncovered, and the show's host was former Sunset Beach actor Jack Maxwell. On the show, every episode includes Walker's Planet Gossip with its daily gossip on the day's news. Walker always ends his commentary with "And now you know it all, almost!"

The show's last first-run episode was aired on July 6, 2001.

In popular culture
The television series Second City Television predicted National Enquirer TV in a 1983 skit focusing on an episode of 'National Midnight Star TV' which tackled many of the same stories. This was 16 years before National Enquirer launched the television show.

External links

1990s American television news shows
2000s American television news shows
1999 American television series debuts
2001 American television series endings
Television series by MGM Television
Entertainment news shows in the United States
First-run syndicated television programs in the United States
TV